Helia Sohani (born in Tehran, Iran) is the former captain and the player of the Iran women's national inline hockey team. At the present, she is a member of Iranian women’s national in-line hockey team and in past years, she has been chosen as the coach of this team. She won her first bronze team medal in the Asian games of china as a player-coach in 2012. Then, she gained this place again in 2016 and 2018 in Asian games.

Early life 
Helia Sohani started skating in 1995, when she was 8. On a trip, despite her family’s worries about her being injured while skating, she convinced them to continue skating by showing so much compassion and talent and, in the same trip, she started to learn how to skate without the help of a trainer and just by depending on her own natural talent. At first, she chose figure skating field but, over time and getting to know Roller hockey and with her coach’s encouragements, she chose Roller hockey. She took part in international competitions as the first coach-player of Iranian women’s national in-line hockey team and, after a short time, she started her activity as the captain of the Iranian women’s national in-line hockey team and she held this place for years. In recent years, she has started working professionally in the field of ice hockey as a player and coach and now she held a place Iranian women’s national ice hockey team.

Coaching 
Helia Sohani has been coaching for Iran’s national in-line hockey team. At first, she was chosen as the coach assistant of the team in 2012. Then she continued her activity as the team’s coach in 2014 and now she is the ice skating coach in Iran’s ice box ski run.

International achievements 
 The fourth place in the world’s best clubs in the field of in-line hockey (Hong Kong) 2009
 The third place in the fifteenth period of Asian roller skating competitions in in-line hockey (Hifi, China) 2012
 The fourth place in the sixteenth  period of Asian roller skating competitions in in-line hockey (Haining, China) 2014
 The third place in the seventeenth period of Asian roller skating competitions of in in-line hockey (Lishui, China) 2016
 Taking part in the international in-line hockey competitions as the player and captain of Iran’s international team (Vento, Italy) 2016
 The flag bearer of the skating sports caravan of Islamic republic of Iran in Asian roller skating Olympics (China) 2012 and 2016
 The third place in the eighteenth period of Asian roller skating competitions in in-line hockey (Namwon, South Korea) 2018

National achievements in women’s in-line hockey 
 Runner up in the country’s in-line hockey teams open competition in 2007 with Shohadaye Qeitarieh team
 Runner up in the first period of the premier league competitions of Iranian women’s in-line hockey in 2009  with Tehran-Aleph team
 Championship in the second period of premier league of Iranian women’s in-line hockey games in 2010 with Tehran-Aleph team
 The third place in the third period of premier league of Iranian women’s in-line hockey games in 2011 with Tehran-Aleph team
 Championship in the fourth period of premier league games of Iranian women’s in-line hockey in 2012 with Tehran-Aleph team
 The third place in the fifth period of premier league games of Iranian women’s in-line hockey  in 2013 with Tehran-Aleph team
 Runner up in the sixth period of premier league  games of Iranian women’s in-line hockey in 2015 with Tehran-Aleph team
 Runner up in the seventh period of  premier league games of Iranian women’s in-line hockey in 2016 with Tehran-Aleph team
 Championship in the eighth period of premier league games  of Iranian women’s in-line hockey in 2017 with Tehran-Aleph team
 Championship in Iranian women’s in-line hockey team open competition in 2018 with the I-Fitpro team
 Championship in the tenth period of premier league games of  Iranian women’s in-line hockey in 2019 with Canariam team

Coaching and referee certifications  
Helia Sohani owns the 3rd class certificate in coaching, from the world federation, and, the 3rd class certificate in in-line hockey from the Iranian federation. She also has the 3rd class coaching certificate of ice skating from the Iranian federation. Besides, she is the top coach of bodybuilding from Iran’s national Olympic committee and, she has the 3rd class certificate of in-line hockey refereeing.

Related activities 
 Secretary of Roller skating community of Iran’s skating federation (2008-2016)
 The Responsible for holding the in-line hockey premier league games 
 Coach of Iran’s  national in-line hockey team 
 Referee of Iran’s in-line hockey premier league

Cinema

Appearance in “No room for angels” (Jaee Baray Fereshteha Nist) cinematic documentary
Sam Kalantari decided to make a documentary called “No room for angels”, to demonstrate the struggles and achievements of the members of Iranian women’s national roller hockey team in 2018 competitions of  Namwon, South Korea. Helia Sohani has appeared in this documentary as the national team’s player and one of the effective members of the team. Sam Kalantari, the director, to explain the trailer of the film, writes: “If they ask me one day that, what was one of the most beautiful days of my life, I would definitely say September 10th would be one of them….the day in which we celebrated your medal winning together…I learnt  a lot from you guys and I’m proud of not only you, but also all of  the girls of my country…but…the most interesting thing about this, is that on the first anniversary of your medal winning, your film is getting ready to be released…I have great respect for you and all the brave women of this country…”
This cinematic documentary won the Crystal Simorgh award in the 38th Fajr Film Festival in the field of documentary, and, won the special jury award in the 13th international cinema-truth festival in the field of long documentary, and it also won the award of Art and Experience Cinema.

References

Inline hockey players
Iranian sportswomen
Year of birth missing (living people)
Living people